Zornella is a genus of sheet weavers that was first described by A. R. Jackson in 1932.

Species
 it contains three species:
Zornella armata (Banks, 1906) – USA, Canada
Zornella cryptodon (Chamberlin, 1920) – USA, Canada
Zornella cultrigera (L. Koch, 1879) – NE Europe, Russia to Kazakhstan, Mongolia

See also
 List of Linyphiidae species (Q–Z)

References

Araneomorphae genera
Linyphiidae
Palearctic spiders
Spiders of North America